Aone van Engelenhoven (born 1962) is a Dutch linguist and anthropologist who teaches at Leiden University. He conducts research in the field of linguistics and anthropology, with a focus on smaller languages from Indonesia. He has carried out extensive research about languages and traditions of Maluku and East Timor.

He was educated at the University of Leiden, where he graduated with a master's degree in comparative linguistics in 1987. He wrote a PhD dissertation on the description of the Leti language in 1995. He started as a lecturer of Austronesian languages in 1993 at Leiden University.

Van Engelenhoven was born to an Indonesian mother from the Leti Islands. He was admitted to a local clan in 1989, giving him a special insight into the culture and allowing him to learn the clan's songs and stories.

In 2007, he accidentally discovered a virtually extinct language called Rusenu while studying another endangered language from East Timor called Makuva.

Publications
 Concealment, Maintenance and Renaissance: language and ethnicity in the Moluccan community in the Netherlands (2002)
 Leti, a language of Southwest Maluku (2004)
 The position of Makuva among the Austronesian languages of East Timor and Southwest Maluku (2009)
 Searching the Invariant: Semiotactic Explorations into Meaning (2011) 
 The Spoor of the Mythical Sailfish (2013)

References

Academic staff of Leiden University
1962 births
Leiden University alumni
Living people
Linguists from the Netherlands